Mastersiella is a group of plants in the Restionaceae described as a genus in 1930.

The entire genus is endemic to  Cape Province in South Africa.

 Species
 Mastersiella digitata (Thunb.) Gilg-Ben. 
 Mastersiella purpurea (Pillans) H.P.Linder
 Mastersiella spathulata (Pillans) H.P.Linder

References

Restionaceae
Endemic flora of South Africa
Flora of the Cape Provinces
Fynbos
Poales genera